The chronological list of fixtures for the 2011 Cricket World Cup. All times local UTC+05:30 (India). Group-stage kick-off times are subject to change for television or scheduling reasons. It would be a 43-day-long tournament taking place from 19 February 2011 to 2 April 2011.

Schedule

References

External links
 Cricinfo World Cup Fixtures

Schedule, 2011 Cricket World Cup